First Internet Bancorp is a bank holding company that operates First Internet Bank of Indiana, sometimes called First Internet Bank or First IB, an early state-chartered, Federal Deposit Insurance Corporation-insured institutions to operate without physical branches.

The bank was founded in 1997 by entrepreneur David B. Becker, incorporated on October 28, 1998, and opened to the public on February 22, 1999. It is engaged primarily in online retail banking and investment in securities. Services include interest-bearing checking accounts, regular and money market savings accounts, certificates of deposit, individual retirement accounts, credit cards, and check cards. The bank also offers personal lines of credit, installment loans, real-time transfers between accounts, and the ability to display checking, savings and loan information on a single screen.

First IB is a privately capitalized institution with over 300 private and corporate investors. On March 21, 2006, the bank consummated a Plan of Exchange by which the bank became a wholly owned subsidiary of First Internet Bancorp, a single-bank holding company.

See also
Online banking
Telephone banking

References

United States Securities and Exchange Commission: First Internet Bank Corp Annual Report 2005. Saginaw Michigan, Saginaw Arts and Sciences Academy 2008.

External links

Online financial services companies of the United States
Banks established in 1998
Companies listed on the Nasdaq
Companies based in Indianapolis
Banks based in Indiana